Cotton Hill is a historic mansion on a former plantation in Limestone County, Alabama, U.S.  The house was built in the 1830s by William Parham as the main residence and headquarters of Luke Matthews' 1,000-acre forced-labor farm. It was designed in the Federal architectural style.  The house was listed on the National Register of Historic Places in 2014.

References

1830s architecture in the United States
Houses in Limestone County, Alabama
Antebellum architecture
Plantations in Alabama
Federal architecture in Alabama
National Register of Historic Places in Limestone County, Alabama